Across the River and into the Trees is a 2022 film written by Peter Flannery and directed by Paula Ortiz, based on the 1950 novel of the same name by Ernest Hemingway. It stars Liev Schreiber, Matilda De Angelis, Danny Huston, Josh Hutcherson, and Laura Morante. The film premiered at the Sun Valley Film Festival on March 30, 2022.

Premise
Colonel Richard Cantwell, wounded and damaged by the war, seeks inner peace.

Cast
 Liev Schreiber as Colonel Richard Cantwell
 Matilda De Angelis
 Danny Huston
 Josh Hutcherson
 Laura Morante
 Javier Cámara
 Sabrina Impacciatore as Agostina

Production
In 2016, Pierce Brosnan, Isabella Rossellini, and María Valverde joined the cast of a feature film adaptation of Ernest Hemingway's Across the River and into the Trees, with Martin Campbell set to direct from a screenplay by Peter Flannery. In September 2020, Paula Ortiz replaced Campbell as director, every role was recast, and Liev Schreiber, Matilda De Angelis, Laura Morante, Javier Cámara, and Giancarlo Giannini joined the cast. In November, Josh Hutcherson was added to the cast, with Danny Huston joining the following year in February. Principal photography for the film was scheduled to begin in Venice in October 2020 in the midst of the COVID-19 pandemic in Italy with cinematographer Javier Aguirresarobe. On March 3, 2021, it was reported that production had concluded and that editing would be done by Kate and Stuart Baird.

Release
The film opened the Sun Valley Film Festival on March 30, 2022.

References

External links
 
 

2022 films
2020s English-language films
Films based on American novels
Films based on works by Ernest Hemingway
Films shot in Venice
Films postponed due to the COVID-19 pandemic
2022 drama films